Kyle Knox (born January 31, 1989) is a Canadian football linebacker for the Montreal Alouettes of the Canadian Football League (CFL). He was signed as an undrafted free agent by the Seattle Seahawks after the 2012 NFL Draft. He played college football at Fresno State.

Professional career

Seattle Seahawks
Knox was originally signed by the Seattle Seahawks as an undrafted free agent after the 2012 NFL Draft. He was cut during final cuts, but was signed to the practice squad for the final two weeks of the 2012 NFL Season. On August 26, 2013, he was cut by the Seahawks.

Jacksonville Jaguars
Knox was claimed off waivers by the Jacksonville Jaguars on August 27, 2013. He was waived on October 3, 2013.

New Orleans Saints
On October 23, 2013, Knox was signed to the New Orleans Saints' practice squad. On January 1, 2014, he was promoted to the Saints' active roster. On May 4, 2015, he was released by the Saints.

Dallas Cowboys
On June 2, 2015, Knox was signed by the Dallas Cowboys. On June 5, 2015, he was released by the Cowboys.

References

External links
Jacksonville Jaguars bio
Seattle Seahawks bio
Fresno State Bulldogs bio

1989 births
Living people
People from Los Angeles
Players of American football from Los Angeles
American football linebackers
Canadian football linebackers
American players of Canadian football
Fresno State Bulldogs football players
Seattle Seahawks players
Jacksonville Jaguars players
New Orleans Saints players
Dallas Cowboys players
Winnipeg Blue Bombers players
Players of Canadian football from Los Angeles